Joseph Wayne Miller (born May 10, 1967) is an American attorney and politician. He is best known as the runner-up in both the 2010 United States Senate election in Alaska and the following 2016 election. A member of the Republican Party, he faced Lisa Murkowski in both races, and has aligned himself with the Libertarian Party and Constitution Party.

Miller rose to national prominence as the Republican Party nominee and the Tea Party favorite in the 2010 U.S. Senate election in Alaska. He faced Democrat Scott McAdams and incumbent Republican Senator Lisa Murkowski who, after losing the primary to Miller, mounted a large and well-funded campaign as a write-in candidate in the general election and went on to win the Senate seat.

Before running for the Senate, Miller worked as an attorney in private general practice, a local government attorney, and a U.S. magistrate judge assisting the Alaska federal district court with its caseload. A 1995 graduate of Yale Law School, he was a combat veteran of the 1991 Gulf War and a graduate of the U.S. Military Academy at West Point. He is originally from Kansas and the father of eight children; he and his wife and family moved to Alaska in the mid-1990s.

Miller sought the Republican nomination to challenge incumbent Democratic Senator Mark Begich in 2014, but was defeated by Dan Sullivan in the Republican primary.

Cean Stevens, the Libertarian party primary winner, stepped aside to allow Miller to receive the Libertarian nomination, so that Miller could run in the crowded 2016 Senate election. He once again placed second to Lisa Murkowski in the general election, receiving just under 30% of the vote. Miller again lost to Murkowski in a four-way race, taking 29% of the vote.

Political positions
He opposes federal aid programs such as federal farm subsidies, the federal minimum wage, and unemployment benefits.

He would eliminate the U.S. Department of Education.

Miller supports a repeal of the Seventeenth Amendment to the United States Constitution, which would return the election of U.S. Senators to the state legislatures.

He would reduce American foreign aid.

He would vote to repeal Obamacare.

He opposes cuts to Medicare or Social Security benefits for current retirees. He supports privatizing (or "personalizing") Social Security and Medicare for younger workers. He would remove the federal government as the social security provider and give states the option of providing their own social security type programs.

He has said that scientific evidence for global warming is "dubious at best".

Miller opposes abortion, including in cases of rape and incest, and would allow it only when the mother's life is in danger. He describes himself as pro-life.

He supports the death penalty.

Miller stated at a town hall meeting that he believed East Germany was an example of a nation taking effective measures to control the flow of people across a border. Miller believes illegal immigration is a "critically important" issue to deal with because of its economic effects on health care, education and employment. Miller wants to secure the border to stop more immigrants from entering America illegally and protect the country from possible terrorist threats. Miller does not believe the millions of immigrants already here illegally should be granted amnesty. Miller supports efforts by states such as Arizona to enforce immigration laws when the federal government will not, and he believes illegal immigrants should be deported when they come into contact with law enforcement officials.

Personal life
Miller is married and the father of six children and the step father of two.

References

External links

 Joe Miller for U.S. Senate official campaign site
 
 
 Campaign contributions at OpenSecrets.org
 Joe Miller Security Guards Handcuff & Detain Alaska Dispatch Editor, includes Video, Huffington Post, October 18, 2010
 
 Who is Joe Miller, The Weekly Standard, August 25, 2010

1967 births
Alaska Libertarians
Alaska Republicans
Alaska state court judges
United States Army personnel of the Gulf War
Living people
Politicians from Fairbanks, Alaska
People from Osborne, Kansas
Tea Party movement activists
United States Army officers
United States magistrate judges
United States Military Academy alumni
University of Alaska Fairbanks alumni
Yale Law School alumni
21st-century American politicians
Candidates in the 2010 United States elections
Candidates in the 2014 United States elections
Candidates in the 2016 United States Senate elections
United States Army reservists
Military personnel from Fairbanks, Alaska
20th-century American judges